Sédeilles is a village in the district of Payerne of the Canton of Vaud, Switzerland. Formerly an independent municipality, it lost that status on 1 July 2006 when, together with Rossens, it was merged into Villarzel.

References

Villages in the canton of Vaud
Former municipalities of the canton of Vaud